James Louis Ricks (1927 – 2011) was an American basketball player for the New York Rens. The entire team was inducted into the Naismith Memorial Basketball Hall of Fame in 1963.

Ricks was one of the original members of the Rens. He would play with them from 1932 to 1936.

See also

Black Fives

References

New York Renaissance players
1927 births
2011 deaths
20th-century African-American sportspeople
21st-century African-American people